Alappiranthan is a main village in the this village located on Aranthangi-Karaikudi Main Road SH-29 Aranthangi Taluk of Pudukkottai district, Tamil Nadu, India.

Demographics 

As per the 2020 census, Alapiranthan had a total population of 
4590 with 1855 males and 1970 females. Out of the total population 2000 people were literate.

References

Villages in Pudukkottai district